"Steady, As She Goes" is the debut single of American rock band the Raconteurs from their first album, Broken Boy Soldiers (2006). In early 2006, a limited-edition 7-inch vinyl record was released as a double A-sided single with the relatively unpromoted "Store Bought Bones" as the flipside. A CD version of "Steady, As She Goes" was released on April 24, 2006, with the B-side "Bane Rendition". Two further vinyl releases were produced: the first (marked 'B') with "Store Bought Bones" as the B-side; the second (marked 'C') an acoustic rendition of "Steady, As She Goes" with "Call It a Day" as the B-side.

In the United States, the song reached number 54 on the Billboard Hot 100 and number one on the Modern Rock Tracks chart. It achieved top-10 success in the UK and Denmark, peaking at number four in both countries.

Background
"Steady, As She Goes" is the first song ever written by White and Benson. 

Jack White and Brendan Benson lived three blocks apart from each other in Detroit, and White would often stop by Benson's house to say hi. One day, Benson showed White a slow reggae demo of what would become "Steady, As She Goes". Benson had played all the instruments on the demo, but only had one verse, "Find yourself a girl and settle down..." White took that idea and started writing. 

White said to Uncut in 2006, "It’s asking a question, which is, 'Is doing that – getting married and settling down – starting a new life or is it giving up?'" Speaking again to Uncut in 2006, he added, "I think the big notion in my head was we’re all getting older now and enough of goofing around. All our friends are musicians, so it was like, 'How much of this world can we stay a part of and how much do we reject?'"

Critical response
Entertainment Weekly said the track is "less weird than what we're used to from the ghostly singer." Rolling Stone called "Steady, As She Goes" the second best song of 2006, just behind "Crazy" by Gnarls Barkley. The bass in the song, especially in the intro, has drawn comparisons to the song "Is She Really Going Out With Him?", by Joe Jackson.

In 2007, "Steady, As She Goes" was nominated for a Grammy Award for Best Rock Performance by a Duo or Group with Vocal.

Music video
There are two music videos for "Steady, As She Goes". The first music video was directed by Jim Jarmusch, and focuses on the band performing the song. It premiered on MTV Two on March 10, 2006, and was also available for streaming on the band's website. In the second music video, the Raconteurs teamed up with Paul Reubens. In this video, each band member plays an imaginary speed-racing hero in an old-fashioned soap box race, following the heroes on their cut-throat chase for first place.  Reubens plays an unscrupulous pit boss, stooping to low levels to ensure a win for his racer, Jack Lawrence. Lawrence and Reubens (wearing standard melodrama-villain handlebar moustaches) cheat many times throughout the race, to make sure that Lawrence wins. Patrick falls off a cliff, Brendan crashes, and Reubens shoots White ("the Copper Kid") with a blow gun. Lawrence wins.  The latter video premiered exclusively on Yahoo! Music on June 19, 2006.

Covers
The song was covered by Corinne Bailey Rae for BBC Radio 1's Live lounge. It was frequently covered live by Fitz and the Tantrums, and was covered live by Adele during "Backstage at BBC Radio 1's Big Weekend" on May 10, 2008. It was additionally covered in an October 2019 video essay by Abigail Thorn.

Track listings

7-inch single: A and B
A. "Steady, As She Goes" – 3:38 (3:35 on B)
B. "Store Bought Bones" – 2:27 (2:25 on B)

7-inch single: C
A. "Steady, As She Goes" (acoustic) – 4:11
B. "Call It a Day" – 3:34

US and UK CD single
 "Steady, As She Goes" – 3:35
 "The Bane Rendition" – 4:20

Australian CD single
 "Steady, As She Goes" – 3:37
 "The Bane Rendition" – 4:19
 "Steady, As She Goes" (acoustic) – 4:10

Charts

Weekly charts

Year-end charts

Certifications

Release history

References

External links
 NME Review "...wonderful..." link Feb 2006

2006 songs
2006 debut singles
The Raconteurs songs
Songs written by Brendan Benson
Songs written by Jack White
Third Man Records singles
V2 Records singles
XL Recordings singles